Kent Greenfield (July 1, 1902 – March 14, 1978) was a pitcher in Major League Baseball for six seasons, from 1924 to 1929. Greenfield was born in Guthrie, Kentucky, and was a childhood friend of author Robert Penn Warren.

References

External links

 Stuart A. Rose Manuscript, Archives, and Rare Book Library

1902 births
1978 deaths
Baseball players from Kentucky
Major League Baseball pitchers
Brooklyn Robins players
New York Giants (NL) players
Boston Braves players
People from Guthrie, Kentucky
Hopkinsville Hoppers players
Portsmouth Truckers players
New Haven Profs players
Reading Keystones players